Symphoricarpos rotundifolius is a North American subshrub in the honeysuckle family, also known by the common name round-leaved snowberry.

Habitat and range
Symphoricarpos rotundifolius is native to the western United States and northwestern Mexico. It has been found in California, Arizona, New Mexico, Colorado, Utah, Nevada, Idaho, eastern Oregon, the Oklahoma Panhandle, far western Texas, and northern Baja California.

Growth pattern

Stems and leaves
Older woody parts are covered in shreddy bark and smaller, newer twigs are coated in fuzzy hairs.

The species epithet, rotundifolia ("round leaved") is slightly misleading, since the  leaves are oval to elliptic, not perfectly circular. Leaves are green above, and pale green with many veins below.

Inflorescence and fruit
The inflorescence is a raceme emerging from the leaf axils with one or two pendant flowers having narrowly bell-shaped, pink to white corollas up to 1 cm (0.4 inch) with a lobed mouth.

The fruit is a white berry-like drupe about a centimeter (0.4 inch) wide, containing two seeds.

The genus name means "fruits together", referring to flowers and fruits usually occurring in pairs.

It flowers from June to August.

References

External links
Jepson Manual Treatment
Calphotos Photo gallery, University of California
photo of herbarium specimen at Missouri Botanical Garden, collected in New Mexico in 1851

rotundifolius
Flora of Baja California
Flora of the Western United States
Plants described in 1853
Flora without expected TNC conservation status